Khin-e Arab (also Romanized as Khīn-e ‘Arab) is a village in Tus Rural District, in the Central District of Mashhad County, Razavi Khorasan Province, Iran. At the 2006 census, its population was 547, with 153 families.

References 

Populated places in Mashhad County